Natronai Ben Hilai (Hebrew: נטרונאי בן הלאי or Natronai Ha-Gaon, Hebrew: נטרונאי הגאון; Full name: Natronai ben R. Hilai ben R. Mari) was Gaon of the Sura Academy early in the second half of the 9th century, and held this post for ten years. He is responsible for more written responsa to queries posed to him by world Jewry than any of his predecessors, and maintained close contact with the Spanish Jewish community.

Responsa 
Although Naṭronai was of advanced age when he entered on the office, and although his official term embraced less than a decade, an unusually large number of responsa were issued by him. Questions were addressed to him from all parts of the Jewish Diaspora; and his answers, about 300 of which have been preserved in various compilations (e.g., in Sha'are Ẓedeḳ, Teshubot ha-Ge'onim, and Ḳebuẓat ha-Ḥakamim, Tshuvot Rav Natrunai Gaon, Jerusalem 5771, edited by Y. Brody), show his thorough mastery of the subjects treated as well as his ability to impart knowledge. He always employed the language with which his correspondents were most conversant. With equal ability he handled the Aramaic dialect of his predecessors and the Neo-Hebraic; and he is said to have been the first of the Geonim to use the Arabic language for scholastic correspondence.

Opposition to Karaites 
Natronai staunchly opposed Karaism. He endeavored to enforce the observance of every rabbinic provision emanating from or as explained by either of the two great Babylonian academies; and as the Karaites rejected the ritualistic forms of these schools, he made strenuous efforts to establish uniformity among the Rabbanites. Hence the origin of many a ritualistic formula is traced to him.

Naṭronai was also credited with a mastery of transcendentalism. It was said that by this means he caused himself to be miraculously transported to France, where he instructed the people, and then was miraculously transported back to Babylonia. Hai Gaon, however, denied this, suggesting that some adventurer may have impersonated Natronai and imposed on the Jews of France.

References

 Its bibliography:
Grätz, Gesch. 2d ed., v. 248;
Halevy, Dorot ha-Rishonim, iii. 122a et seq.;
Kaminka, in Winter and Wünsche, Die Jüdische Litteratur, ii. 22;
Weiss, Dor, iv. 114 et seq.

Geonim
9th-century rabbis
Rabbis of Academy of Sura
Exilarchs